Ghost Day may refer to:
Ghost Day (film), a 2012 Thai horror comedy film
For the Chinese holiday, see Ghost Festival